Sly Creek Dam (National ID # CA00272) is a dam in Butte County, California.

The earthen rockfill dam was completed in 1961 by the local public utility, the South Feather Water and Power Agency, formerly known as the Oroville-Wyandotte Irrigation District. It impounds Lost Creek for irrigation storage and hydroelectric power, along with the smaller Lost Creek Dam immediately downstream.

Recreation includes fishing, camping and hiking. The site is surrounded by the Plumas National Forest.

See also 
 List of dams and reservoirs in California
 List of lakes in California

References 

Dams in California
Reservoirs in Butte County, California
United States local public utility dams
Dams completed in 1961
Buildings and structures in Butte County, California
Rock-filled dams
Reservoirs in California
Reservoirs in Northern California